Nastassia Bianca Schroeder Clark (born June 24, 1988) is an American television personality, podcast host, fashion blogger, model and author. She is best known for appearing on Bravo's reality television series Vanderpump Rules (2013–2020).

Early life
Nastassia Bianca Schroeder was born in New Orleans, Louisiana, to an architect father, Mark, and a jewelry designer (Georgi Jules Jewelry) mother, Dayna. She has two younger brothers, Hunter and Nikolai, and a younger sister, Georgianna. Her grandmother, Rosemary died at age 95 in May 2019. When she was 11, Schroeder began taking theater classes at her local high school, Mount Carmel Academy When she turned 18, she moved to Hollywood and attended Loyola Marymount University, where she received a bachelor's degree in English writing.

Career

Television 
In 2005, Schroeder appeared as a contestant on season 8 of the reality game show The Amazing Race, alongside her father Mark, her step-mother Char, and her brother Hunter; the family came in 7th place of 10 teams. After the filming of the show, the Schroeders' house was flooded and destroyed by Hurricane Katrina. They stayed with another family from the show while they rebuilt their house. While going to school in 2008, she was on the television series Queen Bees.

In 2010, she started working at Lisa Vanderpump's restaurants SUR and Villa Blanca, which earned her a spot on the reality television series Vanderpump Rules. The series follows Vanderpump's employees, as they work on building their futures and become entangled in interpersonal drama. She departed the show at the end of season two to move to New York City, then she returned as an Intern to Lisa Vanderpump in season three.

In 2016, she portrayed Koening in the television film Sharknado: The 4th Awakens. She has also appeared in three episodes of Bravo's reality television series Summer House between 2017 and 2019. In November 2019, Schroeder started a digital series called Basically Stassi, with Beau Clark. The series was released online on Bravo's website and YouTube channel. The show followed Schroeder and her guests at her apartment in Los Angeles while playing games and discussing various topics such as relationships, love and life.

Fashion 
Schroeder worked as a model for several years, appearing in magazines like Italian Vanity Fair, 944, Glamour, Genlux and Us Weekly. She has graced the covers of numerous magazines, including Millennium, Cliché and Pacific. Schroeder introduced a capsule collection with accessories e-retailer ShopPrimadonna.com which officially launched in December 2014. "When Shop Prima Donna came to me about designing a line for them, I just knew statement necklaces were what I wanted to do. I wanted to do something that has an Egyptian vibe because I love gold but with a ladylike twist [with] pearls and stones," Schroeder said of the collaboration. She released a clothing line in collaboration with JustFab in July 2019. The collection has two parts "Next Level Basics" and "#OOTN (Outfit of the Night)".

She has received noteworthy praise for her style from periodicals such as People magazine, who described Schroeder as "the most fashion-focused of all her castmates" on Vanderpump Rules.

Writing 
Schroeder worked as a style critic writing for Vanderpump's daughter's website, The Divine Addiction. Schroeder's book Next Level Basic: The Definitive Basic Bitch Handbook was released on April 16, 2019, by Gallery Books. The book was third on the New York Times Best Seller list. The book is a humorous celebration of her most basic tendencies and a defense of the basic culture. In the book, she lists her favorite beauty products, a guide to the best Ranch dressings, tips on how to look good on social media and a graph indicating how psycho you are based on the charge of your phone. She wrote a wedding column titled "Basic Bride" for Glamour magazine for three months in 2020.

Her second book titled Off with My Head: The Definitive Basic B*tch Handbook to Surviving Rock Bottom was published on April 26, 2022, by Gallery Books.

Other ventures 
Schroeder is popular on social media and endorses products such as beauty and wellness products on Instagram. She has partnered with several brands, including Taco Bell food, Botox Cosmetic prescription medicine, Bondi Sands tanning foam and bioClarity skin products.

On February 1, 2019, Schroeder, Kristen Doute and Katie Maloney-Schwartz launched a wine in partnership with Nocking Point Wines called "Basic Witch Potion No. 1". Their second collaboration with Nocking Point Wines, "Basic Witch Potion No. 2" Rosé was launched on June 1, 2019. In 2015, she launched a podcast titled Straight Up with Stassi, which she hosted weekly for five years. Schroeder announced that she is doing "Straight Up With Stassi LIVE" podcast tour in four cities in September 2019.

In March 2021, Schroeder announced her new venture with husband Beau Clark, a Patreon-hosted parenting podcast entitled The Good The Bad The Baby.

Personal life 

In July 2019, Schroeder became engaged to casting agent Beau Clark after two years of dating. Their engagement photos were published exclusively in People magazine in October 2019. The couple got married in a small ceremony in September 2020. Together they have a daughter, Hartford Charlie Rose, born on January 7, 2021.

She has publicly spoken about her psoriasis.

Schroeder has a fascination with pseudo-science such as Tarot cards and astrology. She shares a birthday with her Vanderpump Rules co-star Ariana Madix (June 24), although Schroeder is three years her junior.

Controversy
On June 9, 2020, Schroeder and co-star, Kristen Doute were fired from the show because they reported former co-star, Faith Stowers, to the police for a crime that she did not commit. Schroeder also was criticized for publicly making racially insensitive remarks and for insensitive remarks about the #metoo movement. She has since stated that she hired a diversity coach.

The Amazing Race

In 2005, when she was only 16, Schroeder appeared on the eighth season of the CBS reality show The Amazing Race, which as the season was the family edition, she appeared with her father, Mark, stepmother, Char and her then 14-year-old brother Hunter. They lasted 4 legs and finished in 7th place.

The Amazing Race 8 finishes

A  placement with a dagger indicates that the Schroeder family were eliminated.

Roadblocks performed by Stassi are bolded

Filmography

Published works 

 Schroeder, Stassi. Next Level Basic: The Definitive Basic Bitch Handbook. New York: Gallery Books, 2019.
 Schroeder, Stassi. Off with My Head: The Definitive Basic B*tch Handbook to Surviving Rock Bottom. New York: Gallery Book, 2022.

References

External links

Official site

1988 births
The Amazing Race (American TV series) contestants
American fashion journalists
American female models
American people of German descent
American women journalists
Living people
Loyola Marymount University alumni
People from New Orleans
Participants in American reality television series